Hart of Dixie is an American television comedy-drama series created by Leila Gerstein for The CW. The series stars Rachel Bilson as Dr. Zoe Hart, who aspires to be like her father and become a cardio-thoracic surgeon. After four years of residency at New York Hospital, Zoe does not get a fellowship and takes up an offer to move south to work in a small medical practice.

Hart of Dixie was pick up to series in May 2011, Hart of Dixie premiered on September 26, 2011, on The CW in the United States at 9:00 p.m. followed on sixth season of Gossip Girl as its lead-in. On October 12, 2011, Hart of Dixie picked up for a full season of 22 episodes. On May 11, 2012, The CW renewed the show for a second season, premiered on October 2, 2012. Hart of Dixie was renewed for a third season on April 26, 2013, premiered on October 7, 2013. Hart of Dixie was renewed for a fourth and final season on May 8, 2014, premiered on December 15, 2014. Hart of Dixie was canceled after four seasons.

Series overview

Episodes

Season 1 (2011–12)

Season 2 (2012–13)

Season 3 (2013–14)

Season 4 (2014–15)

Ratings

References

External links 
 
 

Lists of American comedy-drama television series episodes